Husam al-Din or Husam ad-Din  may refer to:

 al-Malik al-Mansour Hossam ad-Din Lajin al-Mansuri (died 1299), Sultan of Egypt
 al-Husayn Husam al-Din (died 1527), leader of the Tayyibi Isma'ili community
 Hussam ad-Din Jarallah (1884–1954), Grand Mufti of Jerusalem
 Hassam-ud-Din Rashidi (1911–1982), Pakistani journalist
 Hüsamettin Cindoruk (born 1933), Turkish politician
 Husām Ad-Din Muhammad (~11th century), grandfather of Shaykh Ishāq

See also
 Sayf al-Din (disambiguation)

Arabic masculine given names